The Punta Jandía Lighthouse is an active lighthouse on the Canary island of Fuerteventura. The name derives from its location on the Punta de Jandía (Point of Jandía), at the end of the much larger Jandía peninsula, which forms the south west part of the island.

History 

Completed in 1864, it is one of the oldest lighthouses in the Canaries; Punta de Anaga Lighthouse on Tenerife was also opened in the same year.

Built in a similar style to other Canarian 19th century lights, it consists of a whitewashed single storey house, with dark volcanic rock used for the masonry detailing. A 19 m masonry tower is attached to the side of the house facing the Atlantic Ocean.

With a focal height of 33 m above the sea, its light can be seen for 22 nautical miles, and consists of a flash of white light every four seconds.

The interior of the keeper's house has been converted into an interpretation centre for the Jandía nature reserve. There are five different coloured rooms, each one displaying information about a particular aspect of the reserve, such as its volcanic geology, vegetation, animals and maritime life, which also includes information about the lighthouse.

The lighthouse is maintained by the Las Palmas Port authority. It is registered under the international Admiralty number D2790 and has the NGA identifier of 113–24024.

Map

See also 

 List of lighthouses in Spain
 List of lighthouses in the Canary Islands

References

External links 

 Comisión de faros
 Autoridad Portuaria de Las Palmas de Gran Canaria

Lighthouses in Fuerteventura
Lighthouses completed in 1864